The men's 4 × 100 metres relay event at the 2011 Military World Games was held on 22 and 23 July at the Estádio Olímpico João Havelange.

Records
Prior to this competition, the existing world and CISM record were as follows:

Schedule

Medalists

Results

Semifinals

Final

References

4 x 100 metres relay